Xu Ming (born January 18, 1981, in Qiqihar, Heilongjiang) is a Chinese former competitive figure skater. He is the 2009 Winter Universiade champion, the 2007 Asian Winter Games champion, and a four-time Chinese national silver medalist.

Programs

Competitive highlights
GP: Grand Prix

References

External links 
 

1981 births
Living people
Medalists at the 2007 Winter Universiade
Chinese male single skaters
Figure skaters at the 2007 Winter Universiade
Sportspeople from Qiqihar
Asian Games medalists in figure skating
Figure skaters at the 2007 Asian Winter Games
Medalists at the 2007 Asian Winter Games
Asian Games gold medalists for China
Universiade medalists in figure skating
Universiade gold medalists for China
Universiade bronze medalists for China
Medalists at the 2009 Winter Universiade
Figure skaters from Heilongjiang